The Turkish Trade Office in Taipei represents the interests of Turkey in Taiwan in the absence of formal diplomatic relations, functioning as a de facto embassy. It was established in 1993.

Turkey had diplomatic relations with Taiwan as the Republic of China until 1971, when it recognised the People's Republic of China.

Its counterpart in Turkey is the Taipei Economic and Cultural Mission in Ankara. 
 
The Office is headed by the Representative, İsmet Erikan.

See also
 List of diplomatic missions in Taiwan
 List of diplomatic missions of Turkey

References

External links

Trade Offices in Taipei
1993 establishments in Taiwan
Turkey
Taiwan–Turkey relations
Organizations established in 1993